Denovan Galileo Torres Pérez (born 4 October 1989) is a Honduran professional footballer who plays as a goalkeeper for Liga Nacional club Marathón.

Club career
Torres made his professional debut for Liga Nacional club Marathón on 15 October 2014 against Victoria, starting in a 1–1 draw. During the 2018–19 season, Torres became the number one goalkeeper for Marathón, starting over 37 matches that season. On 20 February 2019, Torres made his international club debut for Marathón in the CONCACAF Champions League against Santos Laguna, starting in the 6–2 defeat.

On 3 November 2020, Torres helped Marathón qualify for the CONCACAF Champions League via the CONCACAF League. In the match against Antigua, Torres saved two penalties during the shootout to help his club qualify.

International career
On 26 March 2019, Torres made an appearance for Honduras on the bench in a friendly against Ecuador.

Career statistics

Honours
Marathón
Honduran Cup: 2017

References

1989 births
Living people
Honduran footballers
Association football goalkeepers
C.D. Marathón players
Liga Nacional de Fútbol Profesional de Honduras players